The men's 800 metres at the 2013 Asian Athletics Championships was held at the Shree Shiv Chhatrapati Sports Complex on the 9th and 10th of July.

Medalists

Results

Heats
First 2 in each heat (Q) and 2 best performers (q) advanced to the Final.

Final

References

2013 Asian Athletics Championships
800 metres at the Asian Athletics Championships